The Battle of Macao Fort was fought between British and Chinese forces in the Pearl River, Guangdong, China on 4 January 1857 during the Second Opium War.

Gallery

References

Further reading 
King-Hall, Louise, ed. (1936). Sea Saga, Being the Naval Diaries of Four Generations of the King-Hall Family. London: V. Gollancz. p. 234.

1857 in China
January 1857 events
Macao Fort
Macao Fort
Military history of Guangdong
Macao Fort